Eate was a storm god worshipped by the ancient Basques. In some sources he is also the god of fire and ice.

References

Basque gods
Fire gods
Sky and weather gods
Basque mythology